Ralph O. Johnson is an American former Negro league outfielder who played in the 1940s.

Johnson made his Negro leagues debut in 1940 with the Philadelphia Stars, and played with the club again in 1941. He served in the US Army during World War II.

References

External links
 and Seamheads

Year of birth missing
Place of birth missing
Philadelphia Stars players
Baseball outfielders
United States Army personnel of World War II
20th-century African-American people